Robert Henderson was an English professional footballer. His position was full back. He played 10 matches in the Football League for Burnley before moving to non-league side Clitheroe.

References

English footballers
Association football defenders
Burnley F.C. players
Clitheroe F.C. players
Year of death missing
Year of birth missing